Bishop Sérgio de Deus Borges (born 4 September 1966) is a Brazilian Roman Catholic prelate, who served as an Auxiliary bishop of the Roman Catholic Archdiocese of São Paulo and the Titular Bishop of Gergis since 27 June 2012 and was an Apostolic Administrator of the Melkite Greek Catholic Eparchy of Nossa Senhora do Paraíso em São Paulo since 23 May 2018, having these until 17 June 2019. He was then appointed  Bishop of Foz do Iguaçu, Parana.

Life
Bishop Borges was born in a Roman Catholic family in Alfredo Wagner, Santa Catarina. After graduation of the school education, he subsequently joined the Theological Institute Paul VI in Londrina. He was ordained as priest on February 6, 1993, for the Roman Catholic Diocese of Cornélio Procópio after completed his philosophical and theological study. Also, he graduated from the Universidade Luterana do Brasil with a licentiate degree in pedagogy, the Pontifical Lateran University in Rome, the Università Cattolica del Sacro Cuore in Rome and the Pontifical Catholic University of Argentina in Buenos Aires with a Doctor of Canon Law degree.

After his ordination he served as a parish priest in the different localities of his diocese and was a Rector of the Major Theological Seminary of São José (2000–2011). In the same time he was a professor of the Canon Law in the diffenet Catholic educational institutes and worked as a judicial vicar. From 2011 he also is a President of the Brazilian Society of Canonists.

On June 27, 2012, he was appointed by the Pope Benedict XVI as the Auxiliary Bishop of the Roman Catholic Archdiocese of São Paulo and Titular Bishop of Gergis. On August 18, 2012, he was consecrated as bishop by Bishop Getúlio Teixeira Guimarães and other prelates of the Roman Catholic Church. He had responsibility as a Vicar Episcopal for the Region of Santana.

On May 23, 2018, he was appointed by the Pope Francis as an Apostolic Administrator of the then vacant Eastern Catholic circumscription – Melkite Greek Catholic Eparchy of Nossa Senhora do Paraíso em São Paulo.  This and his tenure as Auxiliary Bishop ended due to appointment, July 17, 2019 as Bishop of Foz do Iguaçu, Parana.

References

1966 births
Living people
People from Santa Catarina (state)
Università Cattolica del Sacro Cuore alumni
Pontifical Lateran University alumni
Pontifical Catholic University of Argentina alumni
21st-century Roman Catholic bishops in Brazil
Roman Catholic bishops of São Paulo
Roman Catholic bishops of Foz do Iguaçu